Marasmius oreades, also known as the fairy ring mushroom or fairy ring champignon, is a mushroom native to North America and Europe. Its common names can cause some confusion, as many other mushrooms grow in fairy rings, such as the edible Agaricus campestris and the poisonous Chlorophyllum molybdites.

Distribution and habitat

Marasmius oreades grows extensively throughout North America, especially the east where they are also more diverse, and Europe in the summer and autumn (fall) (June–November in the UK), or year-round in warmer climates. It appears in grassy areas such as lawns, meadows, and even dunes in coastal areas.

May to October in Pennsylvania or Mid Atlantic (pg 38).

Description

Marasmius oreades grows gregariously in troops, arcs, or rings (type II, which causes the grass to grow and become greener).

The gills are attached to the stem or free from it, fairly thick and spaced apart, and white or pale tan, with a cyanide-like odor and dropping a white spore print. The spores measure 7–10 μm × 4–6 μm; they are smooth, elliptical, and inamyloid.  Cystidia absent. Pileipellis without broom cells.

Edibility

Marasmius oreades is a choice edible mushroom. Its sweet taste lends it to baked goods such as cookies. It is also used in foods such as soups, stews, etc.  Traditionally, the stems (which tend to be fibrous and unappetizing) are cut off and the caps are threaded and dried in strings.  A possible reason why this mushroom is so sweet-tasting is due to the presence of trehalose, a type of sugar that allows M. oreades to resist death by desiccation. When exposed to water after being completely dried out, the trehalose is digested as the cells completely revive, causing cellular processes, including the creation of new spores, to begin again.

According to Bill Russell, he says the mushroom has a firm, chewy texture, and a rich, meaty, spicy flavor. Mushrooms can be stored dry (pg 37).

Similar species 
This mushroom can be mistaken for the toxic Clitocybe dealbata or C. rivulosa, which have closely spaced decurrent gills. The latter lacks an umbo, and is white to grey in color.

Some species of the Collybia, Marasmiellus, Micromphale, and Strobilurus genera are also similar, sometimes requiring microscopic analysis to differentiate.

References

External links
 

Edible fungi
Fungi found in fairy rings
Fungi of Europe
Fungi of North America
Marasmius